The National Olympic Committee for Vanuatu was created in 1987 and recognized by the International Olympic Committee that same year. Vanuatu first participated at the Olympic Games in 1988 and has sent athletes to compete in every Summer Olympic Games since then.  The nation has never participated in the Winter Olympic Games.

, no Vanuatu athlete has ever won an Olympic medal.

Up to and including the 2020 Summer Olympics in Tokyo, Vanuatu have sent 34 athletes to the Games.

Medal tables

Medals by Summer Games

See also
 List of flag bearers for Vanuatu at the Olympics
 :Category:Olympic competitors for Vanuatu
 Vanuatu at the Paralympics

External links
 
 
 

 
Olympics